Torodora sirtalis is a moth in the family Lecithoceridae. It was described by Chun-Sheng Wu in 1997. It is found in China (Yunnan) and Vietnam.

References

Moths described in 1997
Torodora